Robert Sidney Pratten (1824–1868), was an English flautist. He played first flute for the Royal Italian Opera, English Opera, the Sacred Harmonic Society, Philharmonic, and other concerts and musical festivals.

Pratten was born on 23 January 1824, the second son of a music professor.

On 24 September 1854, Pratten married the German guitar virtuoso, composer and teacher Catharina Josepha Pelzer (1824-1895), later also known as Madame Sidney Pratten.

Pratten died on 10 February 1868, aged 44, at Ramsgate.

References

1824 births
1868 deaths
English flautists
19th-century English musicians